José Miguel Gallardo Vera known by his stage name Miguel Gallardo (September 29, 1950 – November 11, 2005) was a Spanish singer-songwriter. He was once married to the Spanish actress Pilar Velázquez. He had a second marriage with the ex Spanish
model Elizabeth Irizarry.

Background
Miguel Gallardo started his music career as a songwriter, composing songs for other artists. He started his own career as a singer in 1972 under the alias Eddy Gallardo. His first songs as Eddy Gallardo were "Billy Bom", "Jenny", "Sentimiento", and "Explosion de Amor" all of which were released as singles. One year later, he changed his stage name to Miguel Gallardo and released several singles including "Quédate" which was inspired by Pablo Neruda's poem Farewell and peaked at number one on the Spanish singles chart. In 1975, Gallardo recorded his first studio album Autorretrato which contained the lead single "Hoy Tengo Ganas de Ti" and was released by EMI Records. Gallardo died from renal cancer in 2005 and his remains were cremated.

References

1950 births
2005 deaths
Singers from Andalusia
Spanish male singer-songwriters
Spanish singer-songwriters
People from Granada
Deaths from cancer in Spain
20th-century Spanish singers
20th-century Spanish male singers
Deaths from kidney cancer